"Let It Go" is the debut single by American R&B singer Ray J from his debut album Everything You Want (1997). It peaked at No. 10 in New Zealand and No. 25 in the U.S. (on March 11, 1997). It sold 600,000 copies domestically.
 
"Let It Go" appeared on the Set It Off soundtrack.

Personnel
 Drums, Keyboard, and Clavinet - Keith Crouch
 Guitar - Glenn McKinney 
 Bass - Roy “Dog” Pennon
 Handclaps - Keith Crouch, Dorian Abney 
 Background Vocals - Sherree Ford-Payne, Keith Crouch, Ray J, Rahsaan Patterson, Dorian Abney 
 Vocal Arrangements - Keith Crouch

Track listing
"Let It Go"
"Days of Our Livez"

Charts

Weekly charts

Year-end charts

Notes

1997 debut singles
Ray J songs
Music videos directed by Francis Lawrence
1997 songs
Songs written by Ray J
Songs written by Keith Crouch
Atlantic Records singles
Songs written by Willie Norwood